Seyyed Mohammad may refer to:
 Seyyed Mohammad, Chaharmahal and Bakhtiari
 Seyyed Mohammad, Fars
 Seyyed Mohammad, Kermanshah
 Seyyed Mohammad, Zanjan